The 2013–14 Arizona State Sun Devils men's basketball team represent Arizona State University during the 2013–14 NCAA Division I men's basketball season. The Sun Devils are led by eighth-year head coach Herb Sendek and play their home games at the Wells Fargo Arena in Tempe, Arizona. They are members of the Pac-12 Conference.

Departures

Recruits

Roster

Depth chart

Schedule

|-
!colspan=12 style="background:#990033; color:#FFB310;"| Non-conference regular season

|-
!colspan=12 style="background:#990033;"| Pac-12 regular season

|-
!colspan=12 style="background:#990033;"| Pac-12 tournament

|-
!colspan=12 style="background:#990033;"| NCAA tournament

References

Arizona State Sun Devils men's basketball seasons
Arizona State
Arizona State
Arizona State Sun Devils men's basketball team
Arizona State Sun Devils men's basketball team